Simon Geoffrey Fowler (born 25 May 1965 in Meriden, Warwickshire) is an English singer and acoustic guitarist, best known as the frontman of Ocean Colour Scene.

The Fanatics
Simon Fowler commenced his music career as the lead singer and songwriter for Birmingham band The Fanatics, which consisted of Simon Fowler (vocals & guitar), Damon Minchella (bass), Paul Wilkes (guitar) and Carolyn Bullock (drums). Future Ocean Colour Scene drummer and former Echo Base band member Oscar Harrison replaced Bullock on drums.

The Fanatics released one record in 1989 before splitting, the four track 'Suburban Love Songs' 12" vinyl e.p. on Chapter 22 Records (12 CHAP 38), containing the songs "1,2,3,4"; "My Brother Sarah" (later re-recorded by Ocean Colour Scene), "Suburban Love Songs" and "Tight Rope". Following the demise of The Fanatics in late 1989, Fowler, Minchella and Harrison teamed up with guitar player Steve Cradock to form Ocean Colour Scene.

Other works
Fowler has also appeared as a backing singer for Paul Weller, Alison Moyet, Fine Young Cannibals, and with Kate Rusby.

Merrymouth
In 2012 Fowler formed the band Merrymouth with Ocean Colour Scene band member Dan Sealey, and Mike McNamara. Their debut album, Simon Fowler's Merrymouth, was released in March 2012, and their second album, Wenlock Hill, featuring Adam Barry, John McCusker and Chas Hodges, was released in 2014.

Personal life

Fowler lives with his long-term partner Robert in Warwickshire. He was educated at Tudor Grange School in Solihull, and later studied at The Sixth Form College Solihull where he wrote "Foxy's Folk Faced". He then became a journalist, working for the Birmingham Post. He is a supporter of Birmingham City Football Club.

References

External links
 Ocean Colour Scene Band Biography
 The Official Ocean Colour Scene Website
 The Official Merrymouth Website

1965 births
Living people
English male singers
English rock guitarists
English rock singers
English gay musicians
Ocean Colour Scene members
Musicians from Birmingham, West Midlands
Britpop musicians
English male guitarists
British LGBT singers
20th-century English LGBT people
21st-century English LGBT people